Tarap is a 2006 Pakistani Urdu film directed by Sangeeta. It was shot in Dubai and Lahore. It is known for its popular soundtrack.

Cast 
 Resham
 Saud
 Nadeem
 Sheeba Bhagri
 Babrak Shah
 Imran Khan
 Urooj
 Raheela Agha
 Raja Haidar
 Sher Khan

Release 
The film was released on 24 October 2006 (Pakistan), Eid al-Fitr.

Soundtrack 
The music is composed by Wajid Ali Nashad and the film song lyrics were by Ahmad Anees.

 "Ishq Khana Kharab" - Babul Supriyo & Shreya Ghoshal (6:47)
 "Teri Yaad" - Sadhana Sargam (5:44)
 "Aap Say Tum Huai" - Alka Yagnik & Kumar Sanu (5:05)
 "Mujhay Pyar Ka Nasha" - Shaan (6:14)
 "Badal Do Badal Do" Sadhana Sargam & Shreya Ghoshal (5:42)
 "Do Honthon Ki Piyas" - Alka Yagnik (5:49)
 "Tun Hoon Main Janiaan" - Kumar Sanu & Shreya Ghoshal (5:15)
 "Teri Yaad" - Kumar Sanu (5:44)

References

External links 
 

2000s Urdu-language films
Pakistani action films
Urdu-language Pakistani films
2006 films
Films directed by Sangeeta (Pakistani actress)
Films scored by Wajid Nashad